This is a list of countries by employment rate, this being the proportion of employed adults in the working age. The definition of "working age" varies: Many sources, including the OECD, use 15–64 years old, but EUROSTAT uses 20–64 years old, the United States Bureau of Labor Statistics uses 16 years old and older (no cut-off at 65 and up), and the Office for National Statistics of the United Kingdom uses 16–64 years old.

For comparability purposes, this article uses OECD statistics (where available).

List

* indicates "Unemployment in COUNTRY or TERRITORY" links.

See also 
List of U.S. states by employment rate
List of countries by unemployment rate
 Female labor force in the Muslim world

References

Employment rate
 list